Alliance, in comics, may refer to:

Alliance (DC Comics), a group of fictional aliens
The Alliance (Image Comics), a 1995 3-issue mini-series from Image Comics

It may also refer to:
Alliance of Evil, a group of Marvel Comics supervillains
Hero Alliance, a series that have been published by a number of companies include Innovation Publishing
Rebel Alliance, a group from Star Wars that have appeared in the comic book adaptations

See also
Alliance (disambiguation)
ComicsAlliance, a website devoted to comic books

References